The Ford Center is a multi-use indoor arena in downtown Evansville, Indiana with a maximum seating capacity of 11,000. It officially opened in November 2011 and is mainly used for basketball, ice hockey, and music concerts. It is home to the Evansville Thunderbolts minor league hockey team in the Southern Professional Hockey League and the Evansville Purple Aces men's basketball team, representing the University of Evansville. The UE women's basketball team also played at Ford Center from the venue's opening, but moved its home games back to its campus starting with the 2017–18 season.

Events
The first public event held at the Ford Center was an Evansville IceMen hockey game on November 5, 2011, when the IceMen defeated the Fort Wayne Komets 3–1. The first concert was held four days later on November 9, 2011, by Bob Seger and his Silver Bullet Band. The Evansville Purple Aces played their first basketball game on November 12, 2011, beating the Butler Bulldogs 80–77 in overtime.

In its first year, the new arena also hosted concerts for Elton John, Lady Antebellum, Reba, the Trans-Siberian Orchestra, Steel Panther with Judas Priest, and Cirque du Soleil's performance of Quidam.

The Ford Center played host to a game in the 2012 College Basketball Invitational, in which the Aces lost to the Princeton Tigers 95–86. The Ford Center also played host to the 2013 GLVC basketball championships and the 2014 and 2015 NCAA Men's Division II Basketball Championship. In September 2014, the Ford Center hosted Women's Flat Track Derby Association (WFTDA) Division 1 International playoffs, hosted by local roller derby league, Demolition City Roller Derby, featuring teams from America, England and Canada. In honor of the event, Evansville mayor Lloyd Winnecke declared the week of the event to be "Roller Derby Week" in the city.

History and construction
The Ford Center was designed by Populous (formerly HOK Sport) as a replacement for Roberts Municipal Stadium. The $127.5 million arena was approved by the Evansville City Council on December 22, 2008. Demolition work on the site began on December 5, 2009.

The Ford Center is bounded by Main Street, Martin Luther King Jr. Boulevard, 6th Street, and Walnut Street. As planned, it will eventually connect to a new convention hotel and the existing convention center.

On August 17, 2011, the facility's name, Ford Center, was announced. The naming rights were the result of a 10-year, $4.2 million agreement with the Tri-State Ford Dealers.

On January 18, 2012, Aces junior Colt Ryan set an arena record with 39 points in a win against the Bradley Braves.

In 2016, the ECHL's Evansville IceMen and the City of Evansville failed to come to an agreement on a new lease and the IceMen's owner, Ron Geary, announced his intentions to relocate the team to Owensboro, Kentucky. In response, the City of Evansville brought in a new minor league hockey team called the Evansville Thunderbolts as part of the Southern Professional Hockey League for the 2016–17 season.

Gallery

See also

 List of NCAA Division I basketball arenas

References

External links

Ford Center official website
Evansville Athletics - Ford Center
Interior/exterior of new Downtown arena official site Evansville Courier & Press

Evansville Purple Aces basketball
College basketball venues in the United States
Indoor arenas in Indiana
Sports venues in Evansville, Indiana
Indoor ice hockey venues in the United States
Ford Motor Company
Ice hockey venues in Indiana
Populous (company) buildings
Sports venues completed in 2011
Music venues in Indiana